Gerard Tap (27 January 1900 – 1 January 1980) was a Dutch footballer. He played in one match for the Netherlands national football team in 1928.

References

External links
 

1900 births
1980 deaths
Dutch footballers
Netherlands international footballers
Association footballers not categorized by position